Marco Antônio Dos Santos (born November 11, 1966), commonly known as Marquinho, is a Brazilian football player.

Born in Porto Alegre, Brazil, Marquinho started his career playing as an attacking midfielder with Ponte Preta in Brazil.  He also played with Internacional Porto Alegre, Sport Boys (Peru), Sporting Cristal (Peru), Casino Salzburg (Austria), Alianza Lima (Peru), Puebla F.C. (Mexico) and Tampico Madero (Mexico) Colorado Rapids (USA), Çanakkale Dardanelspor (Turkey).  In 1994, he led Casino Salzburg to the final of the UEFA Cup where they lost to Internazionale. He also won La República's best foreign player of the year award when he played for Alianza Lima in 1991. Marquinho scored three goals in 11 appearances for Colorado Rapids before being released in June 1998.

References

External links

1966 births
Living people
Brazilian footballers
Brazilian expatriate footballers
Associação Atlética Ponte Preta players
Sport Club Internacional players
Colorado Rapids players
Sport Boys footballers
Sporting Cristal footballers
Club Alianza Lima footballers
Club Puebla players
FC Red Bull Salzburg players
Expatriate footballers in Austria
Expatriate footballers in Mexico
Expatriate footballers in Peru
Expatriate footballers in Turkey
Expatriate soccer players in the United States
Peruvian Primera División players
Major League Soccer players
Association football midfielders
Footballers from Porto Alegre